Gyimi river also known as Jimi River is a stream in Ashanti Region, Ghana. It forms in area of a Naimakrom settlement. It confluence with Ofin River is near town Dunkwa-on-Offin. 

Word  gyimi in the Twi language of the Akan people can be roughly translated as foolery or not normal.

Water pollution 
Within the Gyimi (Jimi) river basin heavy metal contamination is present. It is caused by mining operations.

See also 
Obuasi Gold Mine

References

Rivers of Ghana